Steve Farmer may refer to:

 Steve Farmer (musician) (born 1948), American guitarist and composer
 Steve Farmer (darts player) (born 1965), English darts player